Seddouk District is a district of Béjaïa Province, Algeria.

Municipalities
The district is further divided into 4 municipalities:
Seddouk
Amalou
Mecisna
Bouhamza

References

Districts of Béjaïa Province